Lim Jung-woo may refer to:

Lim Jung-woo (field hockey) (born 1978), field hockey player
Lim Jung-woo (baseball) (born 1991)